Riaz Husein Poonawala (born 8 May 1961) is an Indian-born cricketer who played for the United Arab Emirates national cricket team. Poonawala started his first-class cricket career playing for his native Maharashtra for whom he played 28 games between 1982–83 and 1987–88. He later emigrated to the United Arab Emirates for whom he played in the 1994 ICC Trophy. Poonawala also competed in two One Day Internationals in the 1994 Pepsi Austral-Asia Cup.

External links

1961 births
Living people
Indian cricketers
Indian Muslims
Maharashtra cricketers
Emirati cricketers
United Arab Emirates One Day International cricketers
Emirati cricket captains
Indian emigrants to the United Arab Emirates
Indian expatriate sportspeople in the United Arab Emirates
West Zone cricketers
Dawoodi Bohras
Cricketers from Pune
Gujarati people